Kawaidani Choseichi  is a gravity dam located in Hiroshima Prefecture in Japan. The dam is used for flood control. The catchment area of the dam is 8.7 km2. The dam impounds about 1  ha of land when full and can store 47 thousand cubic meters of water. The construction of the dam was completed in 1971.

References

Dams in Hiroshima Prefecture